Technical rescue is the use of specialised tools and skills for rescue, including vehicle extrication, confined space rescue, rope rescue, trench rescue, structural collapse rescue, water rescue, and wilderness search and rescue. These often require specialised rescue squads as they exceed the capabilities of conventional fire departments or emergency medical services.

In the United States, technical rescues will often have multiple jurisdictions operating together to effect the rescue, and will often use the Incident Command System to manage the incident and resources at the scene. National Fire Protection Association standards NFPA 1006 and NFPA 1670 state that all rescuers must have a minimum of first aid (infection control, bleeding control, shock management) and CPR training to perform any technical rescue operation, including cutting the vehicle itself during an extrication.

References

See also
Rescue squad
911th Engineer Company

Rescue
Search and rescue